Julia Ward Howe School, also called Julia Ward Howe Academics Plus Elementary School is a historic school located in the Fern Rock neighborhood of Philadelphia, Pennsylvania. It is part of the School District of Philadelphia. The building was designed by Henry deCourcy Richards and built in 1913–1914. It is a three-story, five bay, brick building in the Tudor Revival-style.  It features a central limestone entrance and terra cotta trim and decorative panels. The school was named for abolitionist and author Julia Ward Howe (1819-1910).

The building was added to the National Register of Historic Places in 1988.

References

External links

School buildings on the National Register of Historic Places in Philadelphia
Tudor Revival architecture in Pennsylvania
School buildings completed in 1914
Olney-Oak Lane, Philadelphia
1914 establishments in Pennsylvania